Istvan Capusta is a Romanian sprint canoeist who competed in the late 1970s. He won a gold medal in the C-2 500 m event at the 1979 ICF Canoe Sprint World Championships in Duisburg.

References

Living people
Romanian male canoeists
Year of birth missing (living people)
ICF Canoe Sprint World Championships medalists in Canadian